William Thomas Hodge (November 1, 1874 – January 30, 1932) was an American actor, playwright, and theatrical producer. He was born to Thomas Hodge and Mary Anderson. He appeared in the original 1904 Broadway hit play Mrs. Wiggs of the Cabbage Patch, Dream City(1906) by Victor Herbert and the huge hit play for which he's best remembered The Man from Home (1908). The latter play was a huge success for him and he revived it over the years. With it he became along with other stars such as David Warfield and Rose Stahl an actor noted for a single huge success.

References

External links

1874 births
1932 deaths
Broadway theatre producers
American male stage actors
20th-century American male actors